The Floian is the second stage of the Ordovician Period. It succeeds the Tremadocian with which it forms the Lower Ordovician epoch. It precedes the Dapingian Stage of the Middle Ordovician. The lower boundary is defined as the first appearance of the graptolite species Tetragraptus approximatus.

Naming and history
The Floian Stage is named after Flo, a village in Västergötland, southern Sweden. The name "Floan" was proposed in 2004, but the International Commission on Stratigraphy adapted Floian as the official name of the stage.

GSSP
The GSSP of the Floian is the Diabasbrottet Quarry  which is an outcrop of a shale-dominated stratigraphic succession. The lower boundary of the Floian is defined as the first appearance of Tetragraptus approximatus which is above the base of the Tøyen Shale. Radiometric dating has set the Tremadocian-Floian boundary at  million years ago.

References

.
Ordovician geochronology